The .444 Marlin (10.9×57mmR) is a rifle cartridge designed in 1964 by Marlin Firearms and Remington Arms. It was designed to fill in a gap left by the older .45-70 when that cartridge was not available in any new lever-action rifles; at the time it was the largest lever-action cartridge available. The .444 resembles a lengthened .44 Magnum and provides a significant increase in velocity. It is usually used in the Marlin 444 lever-action rifle. Currently, Marlin, who is now owned by Ruger Firearms, does not offer the .444 chambering in any of their rifles. It remains to be seen when or if they will bring the chambering back into production.

History
In the mid-1960s the .45-70 had all but disappeared from the American marketplace. There was no big-bore cartridge available in a lever-action rifle in current production, so Marlin decided to create a new cartridge to fill this empty niche. They created what is essentially an elongated version of the .44 Magnum by making it nearly an inch longer to give it power similar to the .45-70.  The case Marlin created is very similar to a rimmed .303 British trimmed and necked-up to work with .429 bullets.

Some hunters initially claimed they had trouble because the .444 was frequently hand-loaded using existing .429 bullets that were designed for use at handgun velocities. Remington has stated in letter and email, when asked, that their 240-grain .444 bullet was not the same as a .44 magnum handgun bullet. 

Despite the litany of false rumors about the 240-grain bullets, the rifle gained additional popularity as additional bullets were designed for its higher velocity.

In 1972 Marlin re-introduced the .45-70 to their lever-action line, expanding their big-bore offerings. Sales of the .444 are now overshadowed by the .45-70 cartridge, which has enjoyed a resurgence in popularity due to interest in cowboy action shooting. This quick action and powerful stopping power has been shown to be an efficient and useful hunting rifle for experienced shooters.

Performance
The .444 Marlin can push a  bullet at velocities over  generating  of energy. SAAMI has rated this cartridge at 44,000 CUP. It functions efficiently when used with cast lead bullets. Hand-cast bullets allow the shooter to optimize the alloy for strength and expansion at the higher velocities generated by the Marlin over the traditional .44 caliber bullets. Proper cartridge length is maintained by seating the bullet to the correct depth and using a crimp die to put a firm crimp on the seated bullet to prevent slippage in the magazine tube.

The best cast bullet accuracy in the .444 Marlin is attained when utilizing bullets sized to .432 in diameter, both in the older "micro-grooved" and the newer "Ballard" style barrels. This bullet diameter is dictated more by the large diameter of chamber throats than by groove diameter of the barrel. A projectile closely fitting the throat dimensions greatly enhances the cast bullet performance of this cartridge. Full factory velocity handloads when assembled using hard-cast, gas-checked bullets of .432 in diameter rival accuracy of any jacketed ammunition for this cartridge.

Three years after the introduction of the .444 Marlin, Hornady introduced a new, heavier,   bullet created specifically for use in this new .44 caliber cartridge. Hornady's latest offering for this caliber is its new Leverevolution ammunition that has a soft polymer spire point that can be safely loaded in tubular magazines.

Comparisons
The newer .450 Marlin is also frequently compared with it. While it does not have the power of the .450 Marlin, the .444 Marlin is very similar ballistically to the .45-70, the almost extinct .348 Winchester, and is virtually identical to the .405 Winchester, in its  loading.

See also
 10 mm caliber
 List of rifle cartridges
 Table of handgun and rifle cartridges

References

Cartridge Dimensions: Designing and Forming Custom Cartridges, Book by Ken Howell, Precision Shooting, 1995,  p. 359

External links
 The Marlin Models 308, 336, 444, and 1895 at Chuck Hawks
 .444 Marlin, The Forgotten Big Bore

Pistol and rifle cartridges